Doggarts was a chain of department stores in the North East of England, with their base being in Bishop Auckland. Doggarts had 17 locations through the North East at its peak with locations in County Durham, Gateshead & Northumberland.

History 
In 1892 Arthur Robert Doggart, from Aldershot, moved to Bishop Auckland to take up a position of Buyer of Hosiery and Fancy goods for a drapery business based in Auckland House, on the corner of Market Place.

By 1895, Doggart had taken over the business and started running the business his own way. He expanded by opening a further store in Shildon, and by setting up the Doggarts Club. This was an interest free way for the poor miner families to buy furnishing and clothing from the store. 

To assist with the running of the Doggarts Club, two business were set up. Ashton Supply Company and the Economic Clothing Company at one time had 800 staff travelling across County Durham to collect payments from Doggarts customers. The business was known for its Green Vans, Pneumatic Change dispensers and Hand Painted Price tickets. 

However death duties and inflation had hit the business hard, and the business was too small to bulk buy to match the big chains. In November 1980 Jamie Doggart announced the business would close, which at the time still had ten stores, with the loss of 340 jobs. The Bishop Auckland store finally closed its doors on Christmas Eve, 1980.

References

Defunct department stores of the United Kingdom
Defunct retail companies of the United Kingdom
Retail companies established in 1895
1895 establishments in England